Jason Edelmann (born 21 August 1970) is a Puerto Rican alpine skier. He competed in three events at the 1988 Winter Olympics.

References

External links
 

1970 births
Living people
Puerto Rican male alpine skiers
Olympic alpine skiers of Puerto Rico
Alpine skiers at the 1988 Winter Olympics
Place of birth missing (living people)